Dendrerpetontidae is a family of Temnospondyli.

Gallery

References
Benton, M.J. 2005. Vertebrate Palaeontology, Third Edition. University of Bristol

 
Eutemnospondyls
Prehistoric amphibian families